The Committee for Mammal Names is a working group which develops mammals names in Finnish-language.

References

Finnish language
Naming organizations